The Arboretum du Massif des Agriers (4 hectares) is an arboretum located within the 600-hectare forest of the Massif des Agriers near Lamazière-Haute and Eygurande, Corrèze, Limousin, France. It contains about 60 conifers and deciduous trees planted in 1982.

See also 
 List of botanical gardens in France

References 

 Pays-Eygurande description
 Practical Guide, Vacances en Corrèze, page 28
 Mémento du Tourisme en Corrèze (French)
 Vacances en Corrèze description (French)

Massif des Agriers, Arboretum du
Massif des Agriers, Arboretum du